The eighty-eight Cabinet of Bulgaria was an interim technocratic government set up by President Rosen Plevneliev's decree № 56 following the resignation of the Borisov government. The government, headed by Prime Minister Marin Raykov, ruled from March 13, 2013 to May 29, 2013, at which time the new cabinet took office.

Cabinet 

Only 1 member of the Raykov government is known to have had affiliations with the Committee for State Security.

References

External links 
 Presidential Decree № 56 (Bulgarian)

See also  
 History of Bulgaria since 1989

Bulgarian governments
2013 establishments in Bulgaria